Night's Tightrope, known in Japan as , is a Japanese film directed by Yukiko Mishima, based on author Kanae Minato's novel of the same name. The theme song  was written and performed specifically for the film by the rock band Glim Spanky at the request of Mishima.

Plot
Yuki (Tsubasa Honda) is a second year high school student. She volunteers at a paediatrics ward for her summer vacation, because she wants to witness the moment a person dies. She got that thought after feeling envious of a transfer student's story of seeing a friend's dead body.

Yuki has friend named Atsuko (Mizuki Yamamoto). She was bullied in the past and has anxiety issues. She volunteers at a nursing home for her summer vacation, hoping that she will gain courage if she sees the moment a person dies.

Cast
 Tsubasa Honda as Yuki Sakurai
 Mizuki Yamamoto as Atsuko Kusano
 Mackenyu as Hikaru Makise
 Ryō Satō as Shiori Takizawa
 Kazuya Kojima as Kazuki Ogura
 Daikichi Sugawara
 Shizuka Ishibashi as Classmate
 Maiko Kawakami
 Guin-Poon-Chaw 
 Kazuko Shirakawa
 Goro Inagaki as Takao Takao

References

External links
 

2016 films
2010s Japanese-language films
Films based on Japanese novels
2010s Japanese films